Drama Studio London (DSL) is a British drama school in London. It is accredited by the Federation of Drama Schools.

The Drama Studio London was founded in 1966 by actor and director Peter Layton, focusses on developing individual talent nurtured around what makes each student unique rather than teaching conventional acting styles, such as method, classical acting or Meisner technique. Students can take a 1-year PG Dip/MA in Professional Acting, a 2-year MFA in Professional Acting with Independent Production or a three-year Bachelor of Arts (hons) in Professional Acting, in partnership with the University of West London.
The MFA (Masters in Fine Art) in Professional Acting with Independent Production, is recognised in the United States as an essential Higher Education teaching qualification.

Alumni 
 Emily Watson
 Forest Whitaker
 Olivia Vinall
 Elisa Lasowski
 Helen Schlesinger
 Aiysha Hart
 Adrian Lukis
 Mika Simmons
 Nadine Lewington
 Lesley Vickerage
 Lisa Goldman
 Trevor Cooper
 Cory English
 Shobu Kapoor
 Murray McArthur
 Roma Downey
 Jack Greenlees
 Enzo Cilenti
 Miranda Hennessy
 Misha Crosby
 David Marciano
 John Vickery
 Cynthia Stevenson
 Natasha Radski
 Ursula Holden-Gill
 Robert LuPone
 Charles Martinet
 Diana Hayden
 Adil Hussain
 Santanu Bose

References

Drama schools in London
Education in the London Borough of Ealing
Educational institutions established in 1966